Synchlora irregularia is a species of emerald moth in the family Geometridae first described by William Barnes and James Halliday McDunnough in 1918. It is found in North America.

The MONA or Hodges number for Synchlora irregularia is 7062.

References

Further reading

External links

 

Synchlorini
Articles created by Qbugbot
Moths described in 1918